Shabaash Mithu is a 2022 Indian Hindi-language biographical sports drama film directed by Srijit Mukherji and produced by Viacom18 Studios. The film  based on the life of former Test and ODI captain of the India women's national cricket team, Mithali Raj, stars Taapsee Pannu in titular role. It chronicles ups and downs and moments of glory of Mithali's life. The film was released on 15 July 2022. It received mixed to positive reviews from critics but was a major box-office disaster, grossing just under a tenth of its budget at the box office.

Synopsis
Mithali Raj is former Test and ODI captain of women's national cricket team. She led India to finals of 2017 Women's Cricket World Cup.

The film based on her life chronicles the events of her life's journey in the world of women cricket. It presents her struggles and euphoric rise in the women cricket.

Cast
 Taapsee Pannu as Mithali Raj aka Mithu
 Inayat Verma as Young Mithali Raj
 Mumtaz Sorcar as Jhorna Ghosh, character based on Jhulan Goswami
 Vijay Raaz as Sampath, Mithali's coach
 Brijendra Kala as BCCI Main Person
 Devadarshini as Leela Raj, Mithali's mother
 Swayam Joshi as an unnamed young  boy
 Sameer Dharmadhikari as Dorai Raj, Mithali's father
 Aditi Aryan as Sresha Badyal
 Nirali Oza as Preeti Valhar
 Priya Kumari as Roma Kwatra
 Ramya Suresh as Himakshi Ganeshan
 Titeeksha Tawde as Khushi Anvekar
 Kajal Shishodia as Kajal Sutar
 Manashree Gavande as Manashree Gavande
 Vaishnavi Desai as Vaishnavi Madiga
 Ramsingh Falkoti as Peon Bala
 Shilpi Marwaha as Sukumari Marwaha
 Anushree Kushwaha as Noorie
 Kasturi Jagnam as Young Noorie
 Nishant Pradhan as Mithun Raj, Mithali's brother 
 Kalyani Jha as Perizad
 Sampa Mandal as Nilu Paswan
 Vishak Nair as Chandan ji (Nilu's Fiance)

Production

Development
After the 2017 Women's Cricket World Cup, Viacom 18 Motion Pictures acquired the rights to make a feature film on Raj's life. She said, "Hoping that this movie inspires more people, especially young girls to take up sports as a career."

The biopic was planned to shoot in 2019. Raj said, "I think Priyanka Chopra will be a great choice (to play me in the biopic). Our personalities match a lot. I am not a movie buff, so I'd love the experts to do their job." Finally it was Taapsee Pannu who was chosen to play the role of Mithali Raj in the biopic named as Shabaash Mithu, to be directed by Rahul Dholakia in 2020.

Preparation and training
On 3 December 2019, coinciding with the birthday of Mithali Raj, the film was finalized with Taapsee Pannu in the titular role and Rahul Dholakia as director. In January 2021 Pannu posted her training photos from 3 December 2019, 29 January 2020 and 27 January 2021. In March 2021, Taapsee Pannu again posted photos of her preparation and training for the film. She trained under Nooshin Al Khadeer, a former cricket player and Mithali Raj's friend. The film earlier was anticipated to be released on 5 February 2021 under direction of Rahul Dholakia, but filming was delayed due to COVID-19.

In June Srijit Mukherji replaced Rahul Dholakia as director of the film due to change of schedule.

Filming
Principal photography began on 5 April 2021 after being delayed due to COVID-19. Filming was finally wrapped up on 9 November. The film was shot on Lord's Cricket Ground in London, and across domestic and international locations to bring real feel of actual events that happened in Mithali's life.

Soundtrack 

The music of the film is composed by Amit Trivedi, Salvage Audio Collective and Charan. Lyrics are written by Swanand Kirkire, Kausar Munir and Charan. The background score is composed by Salvage Audio Collective.

Release

Theatrical
On 3 December coinciding with birthday of Mithali Raj releasing a teaser poster the producer announced the release date of the film as 4 February 2022. The date clashed with Rajkummar Rao's comedy film Badhaai Do, which was postponed to 11 February. Subsequently the film was not released and finally it was released on 15 July 2022.

Home media
The film digitally streamed on both Voot and Netflix in Hindi and dubbed versions of Tamil and Telugu languages from 12 August 2022.

Reception

Box office 
Shabaash Mithu earned 0.40 crore at the domestic box office on its opening day, 0.55 crore on the second day and 0.70 crore on third day.

Film was declared disaster at box office after end of its theatrical run.

Critical response
Anindita Mukherjee of India Today rated the film 3.5 out of 5 stars and wrote "Shabaash Mithu is a film that will definitely not turn around Bollywood's fate in the era of South domination, but it surely moves you". Saibal Chatterjee of NDTV rated the film 3 out of 5 stars and wrote "As a fond tribute to a cricketer who transformed the fortunes of women in India's most popular sport, it puts just enough on the scoreboard not be dismissed as an innings without substance". Sonil Dedhia of News 18 rated the film 3 out of 5 stars and wrote "The film has sincerity and has been crafted with care. It deserves to be watched for the journey of a woman, who is responsible for the incredible rise of Indian Women's cricket in the last two decades". Rachana Dubey of The Times of India rated the film 3 out of 5 stars and wrote " The movie doesn't amply showcase those edge-of-the-seat, nail-biting moments that would have unfolded in her life, especially during the 2017 world cup". Himesh Mankad of Pinkvilla rated the film 3 out of 5 stars and wrote "Shabaash Mithu deserves to be watched to witness the journey of a woman, who is responsible for the incredible rise of Indian Women's cricket in the last two decades - Mithali Raj". Shubhra Gupta of The Indian Express rated the film 2.5 out of 5 stars and wrote "Taapsee Pannu shines in a film that has no space for nuance. Director Srijit Mukerji ensures everything is underlined in this sports drama". Bollywood Hungama rated the film with 3 stars out of 5 and wrote, "On the whole, Shabaash Mithu tells an inspiring tale of one of the greatest cricket legends in the world. At the box office, it has the potential to draw in audiences, especially in urban centres. It also deserves tax-free status."

References

External links 
 
 

2020s Hindi-language films
Indian biographical films
Sports films based on actual events
Biographical films about sportspeople
Cultural depictions of cricketers
Films about cricket in India
Films about women's sports
Viacom18 Studios films
Women's cricket in India
Cultural depictions of Indian women
Films shot in London
Women's Cricket World Cup